Sebastian Doro (born July 7, 1992) is a German footballer who plays as a defensive midfielder for TV Oberfrohna.

Career

Doro played youth football for SV Babelsberg 03, Energie Cottbus, and later 1899 Hoffenheim. In 2011, he returned east to sign for Carl Zeiss Jena, where he made his professional debut in a 3. Liga match against Kickers Offenbach, as a substitute for Christoph Siefkes. After Jena were relegated to the Regionalliga Nordost at the end of the 2011–12 season, Doro left the club, signing for FSV Zwickau of the same division.

External links

1992 births
Living people
German footballers
FC Carl Zeiss Jena players
FSV Zwickau players
3. Liga players
Association football midfielders
Sportspeople from Potsdam
Footballers from Brandenburg